Michael David Bishop (November 5, 1958 – February 8, 2005) was a Major League Baseball catcher. Listed at 6' 2", 188 lb., Bishop batted and threw right handed. He was born in Santa Maria, California.

The California Angels selected Bishop in the 12th round of the 1976 MLB Draft. He then signed as a free agent with the New York Mets in 1983, appearing for them in just three games in his only season in the majors, while hitting .125 (1-for-8) with a double and two runs scored.

Besides catching, Bishop also played the four infield positions and as a corner outfielder during eight Minor League seasons spanning 1976–1983.

In between, he played winter ball with the Navegantes del Magallanes club of the Venezuelan Winter League in the 1981-82 season.

Bishop died in 2005 in Bakersfield, California, at the age of 46.

Sources

External links

Baseball Almanac

1958 births
2005 deaths
Baseball players from California
El Paso Diablos players
Idaho Falls Angels players
Jackson Mets players
Major League Baseball catchers
Navegantes del Magallanes players
American expatriate baseball players in Venezuela
New York Mets players
Quad Cities Angels players
Salinas Angels players
Salt Lake City Gulls players
Spokane Indians players
Sportspeople from Santa Maria, California
Tidewater Tides players